Bombay Boys is a 1998 Indian cult comedy film written and directed by the Indian director Kaizad Gustad. It follows the adventures of three young men in modern-day Mumbai (or Bombay). The boys are of Indian origin, but were all raised in the West. Krishna Sahni (played by Naveen Andrews) is an aspiring actor from New York City who wants to make it big in Bollywood. Ricardo Fernandes (Rahul Bose) is from Sydney, Australia and is in Mumbai to search for his long-lost brother. Finally, Xerxes Mistry (Alexander Gifford), a musician from London, is looking to discover his "roots" in the land of his ancestors.

Synopsis

The three meet each other for the first time at Mumbai's airport and decide to find a place together. In the course of the movie, Krishna finds out that, in order to break into the local film industry, he must first win the (decidedly risky) patronage of Don Mastana (Naseeruddin Shah), a godfather of the Mumbai underworld who's also a film producer. Mastana is a violent man who thinks nothing of impaling a lizard with a knife or shattering the skull of a fellow crime boss for making a pass at his girlfriend.

Ricardo, the serious-looking Australian, finds out the sad fate of his brother, but also manages to fall in love with Mastana's spunky moll Dolly (Tara Deshpande), igniting further flames. Xerxes, who's a Parsi, is led to embrace his latent homosexuality by their gay landlord (Roshan Seth).

Cast
 Naveen Andrews ... Krishna Sahni
 Rahul Bose ... Ricardo Fernandes
 Alexander Gifford ... Xerxes Mistry
 Naseeruddin Shah ... Don Mastana
 Tara Deshpande ... Dolly
 Roshan Seth ... Pesi
 Tarun Shahani ... Danny
 Luke Kenny ... Xavier
 Vinay Pathak ... Spot-boy turned director
 Kushal Punjabi ... Asif
 Javed Jaffrey ... Special appearance in item song  "MUMBHAI"
 Nagesh Bhosle ... Cherry Blossom Kalia

Production
Bombay Boys, which took four years to complete, was filmed on location in Mumbai's bars, slums and markets. The film was made on a limited budget; director Kaizad Gustad financed the film with credit cards as well as by borrowing money from his family and friends.

Soundtrack
The music was composed by Ashutosh Phatak, Dhruv Ghanekar and released by Sony Music India.

Critical reception
The film was subjected to criticism for its homosexuality and profanity. Film critic Yashodhara Pawar stated the film as "The harmful and immature portrayal of ethnic groups in films is an issue for not just South Asians in the global media but also the local and tribal productions in individual countries.". Another film critic Tanmeet Kumar from Planet Bollywood, stated that the film has portrayed India as "Americanized India". Tara Deshpande's performance was praised. Pradeep Sebastian of Deccan Herald wrote that "Going by the crowds flocking to see it, it[']s clear that Indian audiences have begun to expect good things from Indian English films. But this is one they are going to be disappointed with".

References

External links
 

1990s crime comedy films
Films about Indian Americans
English-language Indian films
Films set in Mumbai
Indian crime comedy films
Indian LGBT-related films
1990s Hindi-language films
Indian gangster films
Gay-related films
Films about Bollywood
1998 LGBT-related films
1998 films
Comedy films about Asian Americans
1998 comedy films
1990s English-language films
1990s American films